7 Notes to Infinity is a 2012 documentary film directed by Shrenik Rao. It is a musical documentary which pays tribute to Indian classical music and explores the universality of music through infinite musical compositions created from seven pitches.

Synopsis
The film explains the context in which Indian classical music evolved, and illustrates the role of the great king Maharaja Swathi Thirunal Rama Varma. Legendary musicians, the likes of Dr M. Balamuralikrishna, Padma Bhushan, T. V. Gopalakrishnan, Prince of the Travancore Royal Family- Aswathi Thirunal Rama Varma, the direct descendant of the great king Maharaja Swathi Thirunal, Sanjay Subrahmanyan and a group of young and enthusiastic music students feature prominently in the film.

With unprecedented access, 7 Notes to Infinity was shot extensively in Padmanabhapuram Palace, in Kanyakumari district, the famous Padmanabhaswamy Temple, Kuthira Malika and Kowdiar Palace in Thiruvananthapuram.The documentary also presents Swati Tirunal's compositions in the Hindustani and Carnatic streams of music.

Release
The film was launched on the World Music Day in Kerala with the support of Saptaparani and State Bank of Travancore in June 2012.

References

External links 

 
 
 

2012 films
Indian classical music
Documentary films about classical music and musicians
Indian documentary films
2012 documentary films
Films directed by Shrenik Rao
Films shot in Thiruvananthapuram
Films set in Kerala
2010s English-language films